Cascapédia–Saint-Jules is a municipality in Quebec, Canada.

The municipality includes the communities of Grande-Cascapédia and Saint-Jules, both located along the Cascapédia River.

History
On June 2, 1999, the Municipalities of Grande-Cascapédia and Saint-Jules were merged to form the Municipality of Cascapédia. It was renamed to Cascapédia–Saint-Jules on June 26, 2000.

Grande-Cascapédia
Kigicapigiak had been a Mi'kmaq summer coastal community prior to European settlement. Grande-Cascapédia was formed in the mid 19th century. Named after the adjacent river, originally called Cascapédiac, this name is from the Mi'kmaq words kaska (broad) and pegiag (river). In 1860, the local parish was established that 3 years later counted some 1500 inhabitants, and in 1883, its post office opened. In 1929, the place was incorporated as a municipality.  Another theory on the etymology is that it was named for the Mi'kmaq word kěskebeâk which means "wide paddle."

Saint-Jules
Saint-Jules was founded as a mission in 1899, and became a parish only 2 years later. It was named after Pope Julius I, and also called Saint-Jules-de-Maria (1922-1950) or Saint-Jules-de-Cascapédia to distinguish it from Saint-Jules in the Beauce region. Its post office opened in 1922. In 1949, the place was incorporated as a separate municipality out of the Township Municipality of Maria.

Demographics

Population

Language
Mother tongue (2006):
 English only: 63.2%
 French only: 35.4%
 English and French: %
 Other language: 1.4%

See also
 List of municipalities in Quebec

References

Incorporated places in Gaspésie–Îles-de-la-Madeleine
Municipalities in Quebec